The PEN/Diamonstein-Spielvogel Award for the Art of the Essay is awarded by the PEN America (formerly PEN American Center) to an author for a book of original collected essays. The award was founded by PEN Member and author Barbaralee Diamonstein and Carl Spielvogel, former New York Times columnist, "to preserve the dignity and esteem that the essay form imparts to literature." The winner receives a cash award of $10,000.

The award was on hiatus from 2005 to 2010.

The award is one of many PEN awards sponsored by International PEN affiliates in over 145 PEN centres around the world. The PEN American Center awards have been characterized as being among the "major" American literary prizes.

Award winners

References

External links
PEN/Diamonstein-Spielvogel Award for the Art of the Essay
MBA Essay Writing

PEN America awards
Awards established in 1990
1990 establishments in New York City
Essay awards